Xu Yuhua (born March 2, 1983, in Binzhou, Shandong) is a female Chinese judoka who competed at the 2008 Summer Olympics in the Half middleweight (57–63 kg) event.  She was eliminated in the first round by a South Korean. She is the older sister of Xu Lili.

Major performances
2000 World Junior Championships - 3rd;
2001 World Championships - 5th;
2001 National Games - 6th;
2002/2006 National Champions Tournament - 3rd/2nd;
2006 National Championships - 1st;
2006 World Cup - 3rd;
2008 Paris Super World Cup - 3rd

See also
China at the 2008 Summer Olympics
Judo at the 2008 Summer Olympics

References

External links
 

1983 births
Living people
Judoka at the 2008 Summer Olympics
Olympic judoka of China
People from Binzhou
Asian Games medalists in judo
Sportspeople from Shandong
Judoka at the 2006 Asian Games
Chinese female judoka
Asian Games gold medalists for China
Medalists at the 2006 Asian Games
20th-century Chinese women
21st-century Chinese women